Chivi, originally known as Chibi, is a district in the Masvingo Province of Zimbabwe. The area was originally established as a mission station in 1894 by the Berlin Missionary Society under the name Chibi Mission.

Geography 

Chivi is located in a semi-arid area and occupies an area of 3,510 km2 north of Mwenezi (District) and west of Masvingo (District). The district is situated in the drought-prone region of the country with an average rainfall of 450 mm per year.

Demographics 
Chivi is inhabited by the Karanga people, who are a subgroup of the Shona tribe. Much of the district is occupied by subsistence farmers.

Government and politics 

The district sends three members to Zimbabwe's House of Assembly. Each of the wards in the district has an elected official who works at the rural district council.

The district was divided into three sections for the 2008 elections, namely north, central and south. The district has been a stronghold of ZANU-PF since independence in 1980. The current Chairman of the Rural District Council is Killer Zivhu whilst the Senator for the area is Josiah Hungwe both of the ZANU(PF) party.

Muzvidziwa Village (Gongwa) 

Despite being one of the oldest villages in the district, Gongwa is facing extinction from the massive spread of the growth point. Established in the early 1960s, the villagers witnessed the first and second Chimurenga (war against the white settlers). Starting from the Western hills the village stretches more than 20 hectares to the East. Half of the village has been cut to provide the land for the growth point. In 2000 most of the villagers were moved to various places after the land reform program provided land for them, however conflict among the remaining villagers and the District Council raised as the council did not have enough funds for the relocation of the villagers. The school was built by some Mujibhas to provide education to their children.

Chivi South 

Chivi south is made up of wards 1, 19, 22, 23, 24, 25, 26, 27, 28, 29, and 32. 

Manyiwa village falls under chief Nemauzhe Mutau Zinhumwe, Donono, Mukanga Tumburai Zivuku Runesu Maringire, and others.

The MP for Chivi South is Killer Zivhu of ZANU (PF). To note some schools Chamanhanzva High school, Neruvanga, Chasiyatende, Berejena and Magwari Primary school.

Chivi Central 

Chivi East comprises wards 14, 15, 17, 18, 20, 21, 24, 25. The MP for the area is E. Gwanongodza. The councilor of ward 14 is Mandebvu. Village heads: Madhigi village Freddie Madhigi/Madigi Under Chief Chimhamhiwa.

Chivi North 

The constituency seat is made up of eleven wards, namely 5, 9, 10, 11, 12, 13, 16, 22, 23, and 32. The MP is Mathias Tongofa. Village heads; Nhapata, Mahagwe, Chipare, Mafuku, Chidhindi, Mangwana, Matumba, Zvidavo, Mhori. The chief is Madyangove.

Education

Nyaningwe High School 

The school is the second largest and at the growth point. Nyaningwe was established in 2001 by a local catholic priest, Father Guido Zannet as a missionary school to curb walking distance crisis to access secondary education at nearby Chibi Mission, Tambudzai and Chinembiri secondary schools are at least  from the growth point. In 2015 the school had over 700 students, in form 1 to 4 classes and A level offering commercials and Arts. Most events are held at the Nyaningwe High school Hall which is the best and largest in the district.

Other Schools 

The district also has many Missionary schools: Chibi High, Berejena Mission, Nyaningwe St. Lukes and other smaller day secondary schools.

Some of the primary schools found in the district are: Mushayi; Madyangove; Mpagamuri;Mapuvire; Mawadze; Musvovi; Chomuruvati; St Marry, Nemauzhe; Berejena mission; Chikofa, Gwamatoto; Muvhundusi, Vundembe, Vuravhi, Dombo, Mazorodze, Mangwana, Nyevedzanai, Masunda South, Masunda North, Chasiya; Matihwa, Mhosva, Befura, Mukotosi, Madamombe, Mudadisi, Sukwe, Takavarasha.

Further reading

References 

 
Districts of Masvingo Province
Districts of Zimbabwe